Frederic George Stutz (born 9 September 1992), is an American professional basketball player for AB Castelló of the LEB Oro.

High school career
Stutz attended John H. Castle High School in Newburgh, Indiana where he won Southern Indiana Athletic Conference championships. Was named the 2011 Evansville Courier & Press All-Metro Player of the Year, averaging 21.6 points and 10.6 rebounds per game.

College career
Played in and started all 32 games as a freshman, averaging 8.0 points and 4.5 rebounds per game. As a sophomore he played in and started all 35 games, averaging 8.1 points and a team-best 4.6 rebounds per game. Played in all 34 games and averaged 8.6 points along with 4.6 rebounds per game as a junior. Played four games during Eastern Kentucky's summer tour in Australia. As a senior he played 32 games, averaging career-best 15.6 points and 5.7 rebounds. Named First-team NABC All-District and First-team All-OVC.

Professional career
After playing at Eastern Kentucky, Stutz started his pro career in 2015 with the Dutch club Zorg en Zekerheid Leiden. On 6 December 2015 he left the team after 6 games of the Dutch Basketball League and 3 of the FIBA Europe Cup. Three days after he joined the Slovak club Inter Bratislava, where he played 3 games.

In July 2016 he joined the Kosovar club KB Trepça, playing Kosovo Basketball Superleague and Balkan International Basketball League. Next season played for the 2018 kosovar champions Bashkimi Prizren.

On 21 September 2018, signed for LEB Oro side Força Lleida.

References

External links
FEB profile
Eastern Kentucky Colonels profile
Real GM profile

1992 births
Living people
American expatriate basketball people in the Netherlands
American expatriate basketball people in Slovakia
American expatriate basketball people in Kosovo
American expatriate basketball people in Spain
American men's basketball players
B.S. Leiden players
BK Inter Bratislava players
Bashkimi Prizren players
Força Lleida CE players
Eastern Kentucky Colonels men's basketball players
Power forwards (basketball)
AB Castelló players